This list of Baptist denominations is a list of subdivisions of Baptists, with their various Baptist associations, conferences, conventions, fellowships, groups, and unions around the world. Unless otherwise noted, information comes from the World Baptist Alliance.

Africa

Central Africa
Chadian Association of Baptist Churches
Baptist Churches of the Central African Republic 
Evangelical Baptist Church of the Central African Republic 
Baptist Community of Congo 
Baptist Community of the Congo River 
Cameroon Baptist Church 
Cameroon Baptist Convention 
Union of Baptist Churches of Cameroon

Southern Africa
African Baptist Assembly of Malawi, Inc.
African United Baptist Church
Association of Bible Baptist Churches in Madagascar 
Baptist Convention of Angola 
Baptist Evangelical Association of Madagascar 
Baptist Union of Southern Africa
Baptist Union of Zambia
Igreja União Baptista de Moçambique 
Union of Baptist Churches in Burundi 
Union of Baptist Churches in Rwanda

West Africa
Ghana Baptist Convention
Nigerian Baptist Convention
Togo Baptist Convention
Union of Missionary Baptist Churches in Ivory Coast

East Africa
Baptist Convention of Kenya
Baptist Convention of Tanzania
Sudan Interior Church

Asia and Oceania

Regional bodies
 Asia Pacific Baptist Federation

East Asia
Baptist Convention of Hong Kong 
Japan Baptist Association 
Japan Baptist Convention

Bangladesh
Bangladesh Baptist Church Fellowship
Bangladesh Baptist Church Sangha

India

Angami Baptist Church Council
Ao Baptist Arogo Mungdang 
Arunachal Baptist Church Council
Assam Baptist Convention
Baptist Church of Mizoram
Baptist Union of North India
Bengal Baptist Fellowship
Bengal Orissa Bihar Baptist Convention
 Boro Baptist Church Association
 Boro Baptist Convention 
Council of Baptist Churches in Northeast India
Council of Baptist Churches in Northern India
Garo Baptist Convention
Karbi-Anglong Baptist Convention
Kuki Baptist Convention
Lower Assam Baptist Union
Manipur Baptist Convention
Nagaland Baptist Church Council
North Bank Baptist Christian Association
Nyishi Baptist Church Council
Rabha Baptist Church Union
Samavesam of Telugu Baptist Churches
Separate Baptists in Christ
Seventh Day Baptist
Tripura Baptist Christian Union of India

Southeast Asia
Malaysia Baptist Convention
Myanmar Baptist Convention
Singapore Baptist Convention
Union of Indonesian Baptist Churches

Philippines
Association of Fundamental Baptist Churches in the Philippines
Baptist Conference of the Philippines
Convention of Philippine Baptist Churches
Philippine Chinese Baptist Convention

Oceania
Baptist Union of Australia
Baptist Union of Papua New Guinea
Baptist Union of New Zealand
Marianas Association of General Baptists
Solomons Baptist Association

The Caribbean

Barbados

Spiritual Baptist

Cuba
Baptist Convention of Eastern Cuba 
Baptist Convention of Western Cuba

Haiti
Baptist Convention of Haiti 
Evangelical Baptist Mission of South Haiti

Jamaica

Jamaica Baptist Union

Other
Cayman Baptist Association

St. Vincent and the Grenadines 
Spiritual Baptist

Europe and Eurasia

Regional bodies
European Baptist Federation
International Baptist Convention
Eurasia

Continental Europe

All-Ukrainian Union of Churches of Evangelical Christian Baptists
Association of Baptist Churches in Ireland
Baptist Evangelical Christian Union of Italy
Unity of the Brethren Baptists in the Czech Republic
Baptist Union of Croatia
Baptist Union of Denmark
Baptist Union of Hungary
Baptist Union of Norway
Baptist Union of Poland
Baptist Union of Romania
Baptist Union of Sweden
Brotherhood of Baptist Churches
Brotherhood of Independent Baptist Churches and Ministries of Ukraine
Convention of the Hungarian Baptist Churches of Romania
Evangelical Reformed Baptist Churches in Italy
Federation of Evangelical Baptist Churches of France
Swedish Baptist Union of Finland
Union of Baptist Churches in the Netherlands
Union of the Baptist Christians in North Macedonia
Union of Baptist Churches in Serbia
Union of Baptists in Belgium
Union of Christian Evangelical Baptist Churches of Moldova
Union of Evangelical Baptists of Spain
Union of Evangelical Christians-Baptists in Serbia and Montenegro
Union of Evangelical Free Church Congregations in Germany

Eurasia

Russian Union of Evangelical Christians-Baptists
Union of Evangelical Christian Baptists of Kazakhstan

United Kingdom
 Baptist Union of Great Britain
 Baptist Union of Scotland
 Baptist Union of Wales
 Fellowship of Independent Evangelical Churches - All Reformed, mostly Baptist
 Old Baptist Union
 Strict Baptists

Middle East
Association of Baptist Churches in Israel
Lebanese Baptist Convention

North America

Canada
Association of Regular Baptist Churches
Baptist General Conference of Canada
Canadian Baptist Ministries
Canadian National Baptist Convention
Central Canada Baptist Conference
Convention of Atlantic Baptist Churches
Covenanted Baptist Church of Canada
Baptist Convention of Ontario and Quebec
Baptist Union of Western Canada
Fellowship of Evangelical Baptist Churches in Canada
Landmark Missionary Baptist Association of Quebec
North American Baptist Conference 
Primitive Baptist Conference of New Brunswick, Maine and Nova Scotia
Sovereign Grace Fellowship of Canada
Ukrainian Evangelical Baptist Convention of Canada
Union of French Baptist Churches of Canada
Union of Slavic Churches of Evangelical Christians and Slavic Baptists of Canada

Mexico
National Baptist Convention of Mexico (Convención Nacional Bautista de Mexico)

United States

National bodies 
Alliance of Baptists 
American Baptist Association 
American Baptist Churches in the USA 
Association of Reformed Baptist Churches of America 
Association of Welcoming and Affirming Baptists 
Baptist Bible Fellowship International 
Baptist Missionary Association of America 
Central Baptist Association 
Christian Unity Baptist Association 
Conservative Baptist Association of America 
Continental Baptist Churches 
Converge (formerly Baptist General Conference)
Cooperative Baptist Fellowship 
Enterprise Association of Regular Baptists 
Free Will Baptist 
Full Gospel Baptist Church Fellowship 
Fundamental Baptist Fellowship Association 
Fundamental Baptist Fellowship of America 
General Association of Baptists 
General Association of General Baptists 
General Association of Regular Baptist Churches 
General Conference of the Evangelical Baptist Church, Inc. 
General Six-Principle Baptists 
Independent Baptist Church of America 
Independent Baptist Fellowship International 
Independent Baptist Fellowship of North America 
Institutional Missionary Baptist Conference of America 
Interstate & Foreign Landmark Missionary Baptist Association 
Landmark Baptists 
Liberty Baptist Fellowship 
National Association of Free Will Baptists 
National Baptist Convention of America, Inc. 
National Baptist Convention, USA, Inc. 
National Baptist Evangelical Life and Soul Saving Assembly of the U.S.A. 
National Missionary Baptist Convention of America 
National Primitive Baptist Convention of the U.S.A. 
North American Baptist Conference 
Old Regular Baptist 
Old Time Missionary Baptist 
Original Free Will Baptist Convention 
Primitive Baptist Universalists 
Primitive Baptists 
Progressive National Baptist Convention
Reformed Baptist 
Regular Baptist 
Separate Baptist 
Separate Baptists in Christ 
Seventh Day Baptist General Conference 
Southern Baptist Convention 
Southwide Baptist Fellowship 
Sovereign Grace Baptists 
Two-Seed-in-the-Spirit Predestinarian Baptists 
United American Free Will Baptist Church 
United American Free Will Baptist Conference 
United Baptist
World Baptist Fellowship

State and interstate bodies

Baptist General Association of Virginia
Baptist General Convention of Oklahoma
Baptist General Convention of Texas
District of Columbia Baptist Convention
Interstate & Foreign Landmark Missionary Baptists Association
List of state and other conventions associated with the Southern Baptist Convention
Minnesota Baptist Association
New England Evangelical Baptist Fellowship
Southern Baptists of Texas Convention
Wisconsin Fellowship of Baptist Churches

Central and South America

Central America
Baptist Convention of Costa Rica
Baptist Convention of Nicaragua 
Baptist Convention of Panama 
National Union of Baptist Churches

South America

Evangelical Baptist Convention of Argentina

Brazil

Brazilian Baptist Convention 
National Baptist Convention

Other

Global
Baptist World Alliance
Independent Baptist
Independent Fundamental Baptist
New Independent Fundamentalist Baptist
Woman's Missionary Union
Swedish Baptists

See also 
Baptists in Sichuan

Bibliography
 William H. Brackney, Historical Dictionary of the Baptists, Scarecrow Press, USA, 2009
 Robert E. Johnson, A Global Introduction to Baptist Churches, Cambridge University Press, UK, 2010
 J. Gordon Melton, Martin Baumann, Religions of the World: A Comprehensive Encyclopedia of Beliefs and Practices, ABC-CLIO, USA, 2010

References

 
Denominations
Baptist